Walid Abu Ali is the present ambassador of Palestine to Malaysia and is a non-resident ambassador of Palestine in the Maldives. From 2012 to 2018, he was ambassador of Palestine to Pakistan.

On 30 December 2017 he was recalled by the Palestinian Government after sharing a dais with Hafiz Saeed who is wanted by India in connection with the Mumbai Attacks.

References

Ambassadors of the State of Palestine to Pakistan
Palestinian diplomats
Year of birth missing (living people)
Living people
Ambassadors of the State of Palestine to Malaysia
Ambassadors of the State of Palestine to Maldives